German official war artists were commissioned by the military to create artwork in the context of a specific war.

Official war artists have been appointed by governments for information or propaganda purposes and to record events on the battlefield; but there are many other types of artists depicting the subject or events of war.

First World War 
The German military supported soldier-artists during this conflict.
Luitpold Adam

Second World War 
After 1939, Luitpold Adam was the head of the German military's Division of Visual Arts, which would expand  to include 80 soldier-artists. 
 Luitpold Adam
 Herbert Agricola
 Heinrich Amersdorffer
 Elk Eber
 Fritz Erler
 Franz Eichhorst
 Rudolf Hergstenberg
 Conrad Hommel
 Alfred Hierl
 Ernst Krause
 Emile Scheibe

See also
 War artist
 Military art
 War photography

Notes

References 
 McCloskey, Barbara. (2005).  Artists of World War II. Westport: Greenwood Press. ;  OCLC 475496457
 Yenne, William P. (1983). German War Art, 1939-1945. New York: Crescent Books. ;  OCLC 611620194

 Weber, John Paul (1979).  The German War Artists. Columbia: The Cerberus Book Company.

External links
  German Propaganda Archive, "Nazi War Art: 1940-1944"

War artists
War artists
German